The following is a list of ice hockey teams in Michigan, past and present. It includes the league(s) they play for, and championships won.

Major professional

National Hockey League 1917–

World Hockey Association 1972–79

Minor professional

All American Hockey League 2008–2011

Current teams

American Hockey League 1936–

Federal Prospects Hockey League 2010–present
Also called Federal Hockey League from 2010 to 2019.

International Hockey League 2007–2010

Former teams

Mid-Atlantic Hockey League 2007–08

Current teams

United Hockey League 1997–2007

Colonial Hockey League 1991–97

International Hockey League 1945–2001

International Independent Hockey League 2003–04

All-American Hockey League 1986–89

Continental Hockey League 1972–86

United States Hockey League 1961–79

Ohio State Hockey League 1946–48

Eastern Amateur Hockey League 1933–53

Early Leagues

International Hockey League 1929–36

Canadian Professional Hockey League 1926–30

American Hockey Association 1926–1942

International Professional Hockey League 1904–07

College

NCAA Division I

Big Ten Conference 2013–present
The Big Ten started its men's hockey league in 2013.

Central Collegiate Hockey Association 1971–2013, 2021–present
The original CCHA, a casualty of the conference realignment brought on by the formation of the Big Ten hockey league, disbanded in 2013. The league was revived in 2020, with play starting in 2021–22, by seven members of the men's Western Collegiate Hockey Association, four of which had played in the final season of the original CCHA.
Current teams

Former teams

College Hockey America 1999–2008 (men), 2002–present (women)
CHA was founded as a men-only league. It added women's hockey in 2002 and remains in operation today as a women-only league.

Men

Women

National Collegiate Hockey Conference 2013–present
The NCHC, formed during the early-2010s Division I hockey conference realignment brought on by the formation of the Big Ten hockey league, began play in 2013. It has been a men-only league throughout its history.

Western Collegiate Hockey Association 1951–2021
The WCHA was formed 30 years before the NCAA began sponsoring women's sports, and did not establish a women's league until 1999. No Michigan school has ever been a member of the women's WCHA. In late 2019, seven of the 10 then-current men's members announced they would leave the WCHA after the 2020–21 season; shortly thereafter, they announced that they would form a revived CCHA. With the departure of these seven schools, plus an eighth WCHA men's member announcing that it would drop men's hockey after 2020–21, the men's WCHA is all but certain to fold. It will remain in operation as a women-only league.

Former teams

NCAA Division III

Midwest Collegiate Hockey Association 1998–

Junior

Ontario Hockey League 1980–

Current teams

Junior A Tier II Hockey Leagues

North American Hockey League 1975– 
The NAHL was known as the Great Lakes Junior Hockey League from 1975–1984.

Former teams

Northern Ontario Junior Hockey League 1978–

Current teams

Former teams

Continental Elite Hockey League 2001–2004

Southern Ontario Junior A Hockey League 1970–1976

Wolverine Junior Hockey League 1972–1975
The Wolverine Junior Hockey League and the Michigan Junior Hockey League combined in 1975 to form the Great Lakes Junior Hockey League which later became the North American Hockey League.

Michigan Junior Hockey League 197?–1975

Junior A Tier III Hockey Leagues

Central States Hockey League
Current Teams

Former Teams

Western Junior B Hockey League

League, regional and national championships

References

See also
List of ice hockey teams in Ontario
USA Hockey

Michigan
 
Ice hockey